Theodora Gaïtas is an American lawyer serving as a judge of the Minnesota Court of Appeals. She assumed office on August 24, 2020, succeeding John Rodenberg.

Education 
Gaïtas earned a Bachelor of Arts from the University of Minnesota in 1991 and a Juris Doctor from the University of Minnesota Law School in 1994.

Career 
Gaïtas began her career as a law clerk in the Hennepin County Attorney's Office. She also served as a clerk for Judge Robert H. Schumacher of the Minnesota Court of Appeals and was an assistant public defender in the Office of the Minnesota Appellate Public Defender and Bucks County Public Defender's Office. Gaïtas later worked as an attorney at Matonich Law and served as a judge of the Hennepin County District Court from 2018 to 2020. In May 2020, Governor Tim Walz appointed Gaïtas to serve as a judge of the Minnesota Court of Appeals.

References 

Living people
Minnesota lawyers
Minnesota Court of Appeals judges
University of Minnesota alumni
University of Minnesota Law School alumni
Year of birth missing (living people)
Public defenders